Trenton is a city in northeastern Butler County, Ohio, United States, west of Middletown. The population was 13,021 at the 2020 census. It is part of the Cincinnati metropolitan area.

History
Trenton was originally called Bloomfield, and under the latter name was platted in 1815. Bloomfield was named for Joseph Bloomfield, governor of New Jersey. In 1831, it was discovered that there was already a Bloomfield post office in Ohio, and so the town was renamed after the state capital of New Jersey at Trenton. Originally in Madison Township, it later annexed land in Wayne Township. 

Trenton was once a stop on the Cincinnati, Hamilton and Dayton Railway.

Geography
Trenton is located at  (39.481909, -84.459460). The city lies on the west bank of the Great Miami River.

Demographics

2010 census
As of the census of 2010, there were 11,869 people, 4,160 households, and 3,258 families living in the city. The racial makeup of the city was 96.2% White, 1.0% African American, 0.2% Native American, 0.5% Asian, 0.3% from other races, and 1.9% from two or more races. Hispanic or Latino of any race were 1.7% of the population.

There were 4,160 households, of which 47.0% had children under the age of 18 living with them, 57.0% were married couples living together, 15.1% had a female householder with no husband present, 6.3% had a male householder with no wife present, and 21.7% were non-families. 17.1% of all households were made up of individuals, and 6.4% had someone living alone who was 65 years of age or older. The average household size was 2.85 and the average family size was 3.18.

The median age in the city was 32.2 years. 31% of residents were under the age of 18; 8.1% were between the ages of 18 and 24; 30.7% were from 25 to 44; 20.8% were from 45 to 64; and 9.4% were 65 years of age or older. The gender makeup of the city was 48.6% male and 51.4% female.

2000 census
As of the census of 2000, there were 8,746 people, 3,189 households, and 2,519 families living in the city. The population density was 2,310.4 people per square mile (891.0/km). There were 3,376 housing units at an average density of 891.8 per square mile (343.9/km). The racial makeup of the city was 98.24% White, 0.48% African American, 0.18% Native American, 0.29% Asian, 0.21% from other races, and 0.61% from two or more races. Hispanic or Latino of any race were 0.87% of the population.

There were 3,189 households, out of which 43.1% had children under the age of 18 living with them, 64.2% were married couples living together, 10.7% had a female householder with no husband present, and 21.0% were non-families. 17.1% of all households were made up of individuals, and 6.8% had someone living alone who was 65 years of age or older. The average household size was 2.74 and the average family size was 3.08.

In the city the population was spread out, with 29.6% under the age of 18, 8.7% from 18 to 24, 34.3% from 25 to 44, 18.6% from 45 to 64, and 8.9% who were 65 years of age or older. The median age was 31 years. For every 100 females, there were 96.9 males. For every 100 females age 18 and over, there were 93.7 males.

The median income for a household in the city was $50,933, and the median income for a family was $54,794. Males had a median income of $40,621 versus $26,703 for females. The per capita income for the city was $20,451. About 3.1% of families and 3.7% of the population were below the poverty line, including 3.9% of those under age 18 and 8.0% of those age 65 or over.

Education
Trenton is served by Edgewood High School.

References

Further reading
Bert S. Barlow, W.H. Todhunter, Stephen D. Cone, Joseph J. Pater, and Frederick Schneider, eds. Centennial History of Butler County, Ohio. Hamilton, Ohio: B.F. Bowen, 1905.
Jim Blount. The 1900s: 100 Years In the History of Butler County, Ohio. Hamilton, Ohio: Past Present Press, 2000.
Butler County Engineer's Office. Butler County Official Transportation Map, 2003. Fairfield Township, Butler County, Ohio: The Office, 2003.
A History and Biographical Cyclopaedia of Butler County, Ohio with Illustrations and Sketches of Its Representative Men and Pioneers. Cincinnati, Ohio: Western Biographical Publishing Company, 1882. 
Ohio. Secretary of State. The Ohio municipal and township roster, 2002-2003. Columbus, Ohio: The Secretary, 2003.

External links
City website

Cities in Ohio
Cities in Butler County, Ohio
1815 establishments in Ohio
Populated places established in 1815